Buhl-Lorraine is a commune in the Moselle department in Grand Est in northeastern France.

Geography 
The village is located in Lorraine, as its name suggests, more specifically in South Moselle.

Buhl-Lorraine is located 3 miles from Sarrebourg. Its elevation is about 260 meters.

The municipality is crossed by the Bièvre, tributary of the Saar.

Population

Toponymy 
The name of the village come from the germanic word, bühel or bühl, which means "hill".

Ancient names: Büle during the 15th, Buhel in 1525, Bill in 1526, Biel in 1751, Biel or Bihle in 1779, Bilh in 1790, Bille in 1793, Bühl between 1871-1918, Buhl-Lorraine in 1920, Bühl am Kanal between 1940-1944.

See also 
 Communes of the Moselle department

References

External links 
 

Communes of Moselle (department)